The 2019 Subang League was the second season of the Subang Football League, the fourth-tier football league in Malaysia competition featuring semi-professional and amateur clubs. It is a part of Malaysia M4 League. The season started on 6 July 2019.

Teams
A total of 10 teams competed in the league. The Subang Football League was played from July to September, in single round-robin format.

League table

Season statistics

Top scorers

Players sorted first by goals, then by last name.

References

External links
Official Website

4
Malay